Taeniotes praeclarus is a species of beetle in the family Cerambycidae. It was described by Henry Walter Bates in 1872. It is known from Ecuador, Colombia, Nicaragua, Costa Rica, and Panama.

References

praeclarus
Beetles described in 1872